Frank "Rebel" Mundy (born June 18, 1918 in Atlanta, Georgia, as Francisco Eduardo Menendez – died May 15, 2009) was an American stock car racer. He competed in the American Automobile Association (AAA) stock cars, winning the 1955 national championship, before the series changed to United States Auto Club (USAC) sanction. He also raced in NASCAR's Grand National (now NASCAR Cup Series) and won three races under that sanction.

Mundy attempted to qualify for the 1954 Indianapolis 500 but did not make the field.

Career
Before starting a racing career, Mundy was a daredevil who performed at the 1939 New York World's Fair. During World War II, he served as a personal driver for General George S. Patton, where he would gain valuable driving experience for NASCAR.

NASCAR
In 1948, he moved to Daytona Beach, Florida to pursue a career in motorcycle racing. While at a gas station owned by Bill France Sr., he befriended France and was later invited to a 1947 meeting at the Streamline Hotel to form NASCAR; Mundy helped hold the flash for the photographer while taking a group photo.

Mundy started at the pole position only to find himself finishing the race in 82nd place at the 1951 running of the Southern 500. His career average start would eventually become 11th while his career average finish would become 17th place. Out of the 3583 laps that he completed in his career, Mundy would only lead 458 (12%) of them. His career spanned 1949 to 1956.

One of his accomplishments was winning the 1955 running of the Southern Illinois 100. Frequently seen in rides owned by Carl Kiekhaefer, Mundy's seven-year career would involve him racing in classic races like the 1956 Southern 500 where he finished in 38th place out of 70 competitors. He would also be seen racing at Lakeview Speedway in Mobile, Alabama.

AAA/USAC Stock Cars
In 1952, Mundy began racing in American Automobile Association (AAA) and USAC Stock Car after disassociating with NASCAR following an argument with France; he did not return to NASCAR until 1955.

He won the 1955 AAA national stock car championship. Studebaker and Oldsmobile were Mundy's preferred manufacturers for NASCAR rides.

Personal life
Mundy was born Francisco Eduardo Menendez in Atlanta, where he grew up in an orphanage; he adopted the Frank Mundy name when he began racing.

After his racing career ended, Mundy worked for Penske Racing as a pit crew member.

His widow Mae Mundy would survive him after his death in 2009.

Motorsports career results

NASCAR
(key) (Bold – Pole position awarded by qualifying time. Italics – Pole position earned by points standings or practice time. * – Most laps led.)

Grand National Series

Indy 500 results

References

1918 births
2009 deaths
United States Army personnel of World War II
NASCAR drivers
Racing drivers from Atlanta
USAC Stock Car drivers